Grafschaft is a municipality in the district of Ahrweiler, in Rhineland-Palatinate, Germany. It is situated approximately 20 km south of Bonn.

Grafschaft is famous for its Rheinischer Zuckerrübensirup, a PGI-protected sugar-beet syrup.

The following 17 villages belong to Grafschaft:

Alteheck
Beller
Bengen
Birresdorf
Bölingen
Eckendorf
Esch
Gelsdorf
Holzweiler
Karweiler
Lantershofen
Leimersdorf
Niederich
Nierendorf
Oeverich
Ringen
Vettelhoven

The total population is 10,900 inhabitants (2020).

It has been used as a special stage for the Rallye Deutschland.

It contains the headquarters for Haribo.

References

External links
Website

Ahrweiler (district)
Rallye Deutschland